László Erdélyi (born 10 July 1993) is a Hungarian footballer defender. He plays for BVSC-Zugló.

References 

1993 births
Living people
People from Szentendre
Hungarian footballers
Hungary youth international footballers
Association football forwards
Budapest Honvéd FC players
Soproni VSE players
Győri ETO FC players
Soroksár SC players
Budapesti VSC footballers
Nemzeti Bajnokság I players
Nemzeti Bajnokság II players
Nemzeti Bajnokság III players
Sportspeople from Pest County